Naughty Nanette is a 1927 American comedy film directed by James Leo Meehan and written by Doris Schroeder. The film stars Viola Dana, Patricia Palmer, Eddie Brownell, Helen Foster, Roger Moore and Sidney De Gray. The film was released on April 15, 1927, by Film Booking Offices of America.

Cast       
Viola Dana as Nanette Pearson
Patricia Palmer as Lola Leeds
Eddie Brownell as Bob Dennison 
Helen Foster as Lucy Dennison
Roger Moore as Bill Simmons 
Sidney De Gray as Grandfather Dennison
Alphonse Martell as Carlton 
Mary Gordon as Mrs. Rooney
Florence Wix as Mrs. Trainor
Barbara Clayton as Dorothy Trainor

References

External links
 

1927 films
1920s English-language films
Silent American comedy films
1927 comedy films
Film Booking Offices of America films
American silent feature films
American black-and-white films
Films directed by James Leo Meehan
1920s American films